Kanpur Central - Jammu Tawi Superfast Express is a Superfast Express train of the Indian Railways connecting Kanpur Central in Uttar Pradesh and Jammu Tawi of Jammu and Kashmir. It is currently being operated with 12469/12470 train numbers on twice in a week basis.

Service

The 12469/Kanpur Central - JammuTawi SF Express has an average speed of 55 km/hr and covers 1026 km in 18 hrs 30 mins. 12470/JammuTawi - Kanpur Central SF Express has an average speed of 55 km/hr and covers 1026 km in 18 hrs 30 mins.

Route and halts 

The important halts of the train are:

Coach composite

The train has LHB rakes with max speed of 130 kmph. The train consists of 19 coaches :

 3 AC III Tier
 9 Sleeper Coaches
 5 General
 2 EOG (Generator Cum Luggage Car)

Traction

Both trains are hauled by a Ludhiana Loco Shed based WAP 4 Electric locomotive from Jammu to Balamau from Balamau a Lucknow Diesel Locomotive Shed based WDM 3A hauls the train up to Kanpur and vice versa.

Direction Reversal

Train Reverses its direction 1 times:

Notes

See also 

 Kanpur Central railway station
 Jammu Tawi railway station
 Maur Dhawaj Express
 Muri Express

References

External links 

 12469/Kanpur - JammuTawi (Barfaani) SF Express
 12470/JammuTawi - Kanpur (Barfaani) SF Express

Trains from Kanpur
Transport in Jammu
Express trains in India
Rail transport in Uttarakhand
Rail transport in Haryana
Rail transport in Punjab, India
Rail transport in Jammu and Kashmir
Railway services introduced in 2008